Jagat Shumsher Rana was the Commander-In-Chief of the Nepalese Army from 27 February 1877 to 11 May 1879.

Rana was born in 1826 to Bal Narsingh Kunwar and Ganesh Kumari as the seventh son. He was removed from the rolls of succession after plotting against Ranodip Singh Kunwar. 

Rana was succeeded by Dhir Shamsher Rana in 1879.

References 

1826 births
1879 deaths
19th-century Nepalese nobility
Nepalese generals
Rana dynasty